James Anthony Carpinello (born August 13, 1975) is an American actor who came to national attention with his appearances in Tori Spelling's VH1 sitcom So Notorious. He also portrayed Stacee Jaxx in the Broadway production of the musical Rock of Ages.

Career

Broadway productions
Carpinello first appeared on Broadway in the 1999 musical Saturday Night Fever as Tony Manero.  The musical is based on the 1977 film Saturday Night Fever in which the role of Manero was played by John Travolta.

He was next cast as Link Larkin in the Broadway musical version of Hairspray, but left the show prior to its first pre-Broadway performances in Seattle in order to shoot the film The Great Raid in 2002. He was replaced by Matthew Morrison.

For his third Broadway outing, Carpinello was cast in the Broadway musical Xanadu. Like Saturday Night Fever, Xanadu is based on a film of the same name—1980s Xanadu, which starred Olivia Newton-John and Michael Beck as Sonny, the leading role for which Carpinello was cast. Due to breaking his leg in three places while roller skating during a rehearsal on June 12, 2007, Carpinello was forced to leave the production just two weeks before its scheduled June 26, 2007, opening at the Helen Hayes Theatre. Cheyenne Jackson assumed the role of Sonny as of June 22, 2007; the musical's opening was rescheduled for July 10, 2007.

Carpinello next starred as rocker Stacee Jaxx in the Broadway musical Rock of Ages at the Brooks Atkinson Theatre. When the show previously played off-Broadway, actor Will Swenson performed the role of Jaxx, until Swenson was offered the lead comedic role of Berger, in the revival Broadway Production of HAIR.  Carpinello replaced him before Rock of Ages started performances on Broadway.

Television appearances
Carpinello has appeared on episodes of the CBS series The Good Wife as Detective Anthony Burton.

He guest starred on the season 4 premiere of the USA Network series In Plain Sight. He played former soldier Joey in "Mission Creep", the third episode of CBS crime drama series Person of Interest, and reprised that role as the series neared the end of its run in June 2016. He was a regular on the short-lived Fox medical/crime drama The Mob Doctor.

Personal life
He is of Italian, German, Irish and Danish descent, the son of Anthony J. Carpinello, a former Justice of the New York Supreme Court, Appellate Division, and Sharon E. Kelly, a mental health official. On April 25, 2003, Carpinello married actress Amy Acker. They have two children, a son, Jackson James, born on January 22, 2005, and a daughter, Ava Grace, born on September 1, 2006.

Filmography

Film

Television

Stage

References

External links

 
 

1975 births
20th-century American male actors
21st-century American male actors
Actors from Albany, New York
American male film actors
American male stage actors
American male television actors
American people of Danish descent
American people of German descent
American people of Irish descent
American people of Italian descent
Living people
Male actors from New York (state)